The 1994–95 Macedonian Football Cup was the 3rd season of Macedonia's football knockout competition. FK Sileks were the defending champions, having won their second title. The 1994–95 champions were FK Vardar who won their second title.

Competition calendar

Source:

First round

|}
Source:

Second round

|}
Source:

Quarter-finals

|}
Source:

Semi-finals

|}
Source:

Final

See also
1994–95 Macedonian First Football League
1994–95 Macedonian Second Football League

References

External links
 1994–95 Macedonian Football Cup at rsssf.org

Macedonia
Cup
Macedonian Football Cup seasons